Lisa Christina Siwe (born 17 August 1968) is a Swedish director from Tynnered, Gothenburg.

She studied directing at Dramatiska Institutet in Stockholm and graduated in 1999. As part of her studies there, Siwe directed the 30-minute short film Födelsedagar och andra katastrofer (starring Swedish actress Sissela Kyle). It was well received and won her many awards, both in and outside of Sweden. As a result, she was able to get a job at the production studio Madstone Pictures in New York City. Siwe was hired along with three other directors, and the studio's plan was that each of them would direct their own film. However, only one of them was able to follow through because he had already begun working on his project before he got the job at Madstone. Although she felt that she learned a lot while working at the studio, Siwe decided to return to Sweden to further her career.

After reading the 2003 novel I taket lyser stjärnorna one night, Siwe received the idea to adapt it into a film. She approached Linn Gottfridsson, a friend she met at Dramatiska Institutet, about the idea. They eventually decided the Siwe should direct the film and Gottfridsson should write it. Once they had acquired the rights from the author of the novel, production began. The film, distributed internationally as Glowing Stars, was released in Sweden on 30 January 2009. It marked Siwe's feature-length film debut. Glowing Stars was critically acclaimed and won several awards. Siwe won a Guldbagge Award, the most prestigious film award in Sweden, in the "Best Director" category for directing the film.

Recently, she headed Modus for SvTV, which had the largest TV audience in Swedish TV history on its premiere. Modus 2 just premiered in Sweden.

She is currently living at Södermalm in Stockholm.

References

External links

1968 births
Living people
People from Gothenburg
Dramatiska Institutet alumni
Swedish women film directors
Best Director Guldbagge Award winners